Aaro may refer to:

 Aaro (Shadow of the Eagle), a character portrayed by Mikko Leppilampi in the 2005 Finnish film Kaksipäisen kotkan varjossa
 All-domain Anomaly Resolution Office of the US Department of Defense

People with the given name Aaro:

 Aaro Hellaakoski (1893–1952), Finnish poet
 Aaro Olavi Pajari, colonel in the Finnish Army in World War II
 Aaro Vainio (born 1993), Finnish Formula Renault 2.0 Eurocup driver